Motutanifa  or Motu o tanifa is an uninhabited islet of Vaitupu, Tuvalu, which is located on the reef to the north of the part of Vaitupu known as Muli.

See also

 Desert island
 List of islands

References

Uninhabited islands of Tuvalu
Vaitupu